The 2018–19 Atlanta Hawks season was the 70th season of the franchise in the National Basketball Association (NBA) and the 51st in Atlanta. On April 25, 2018, the Hawks and Mike Budenholzer mutually agreed to part ways. On May 11, 2018, the Hawks hired Lloyd Pierce as head coach. Four days later, the Hawks won the #3 pick in the 2018 NBA draft (though they later traded down to #5 on the night of the draft), as well as enter draft night with four total draft picks over a month later in June.

During the offseason, the Hawks signed veteran Vince Carter, the 8th team that he has played for in his 21-year career. Carter signed with the Hawks despite massive speculation he would make a return to his two original teams; the Toronto Raptors (where Carter played his first 7 seasons with) or the Golden State Warriors (whom drafted Carter in 1998). This season also produced the team's highest scoring game with 161 points in a 168–161 quadruple overtime loss to the Chicago Bulls on March 1, 2019. It was also the third-highest scoring game in NBA history, as well as the third game where both teams scoring broke through the 160 point barrier in the same game. However, this brought the Hawks to another losing season as they missed the playoffs for the second consecutive season after a loss to the Houston Rockets on March 19.

Draft picks

Entering draft night, the Hawks would have four draft picks, three of which being in the first round. Their first of three first round picks rose up into the Top 3 of the NBA Draft after tying the Dallas Mavericks with the third-worst record of the season the previous season. The next first round pick was had by trading Adreian Payne to the Minnesota Timberwolves in exchange for their lottery-protected first round pick, which barely conveyed to them that season thanks to a do-or-die game at the end of that season against the Denver Nuggets. After that, their last first round pick was had by trading with the Los Angeles Clippers and Denver Nuggets, acquiring the Houston Rockets' first round pick from this season in relation to the Clippers' blockbuster trade in their removal of Chris Paul, as well as Jamal Crawford, Diamond Stone, and cash considerations from the Clippers and giving up the Washington Wizards' 2019 second round pick to Denver. Finally, their sole second round pick would be had by losing their first round tiebreaker with Dallas.

Ironically, the Hawks would trade their third pick (which became Luka Dončić) to the Dallas Mavericks in exchange for a protected 2019 first round pick and the fifth pick of the draft, which became Trae Young from the University of Oklahoma. Young was a player that, before the start of the previous season, was projected to be a second round pick. However, Young grew to be a star point guard for the Sooners, to the point where he became the first ever player in NCAA history to lead the league in both points and assists in the same season in his sole season with Oklahoma. For their second first round pick of the draft, the Hawks drafted sophomore shooting guard Kevin Huerter from the University of Maryland as the 19th pick of the draft. Finally, with their last first round pick of the year, the Hawks selected freshman power forward Omari Spellman from Villanova University, who was a prominent member of the team under their championship run last season.

Roster

<noinclude>

Standings

Division

Conference

Game log

Preseason 

|- style="background:#bfb;"
| 1
| October 1
| New Orleans
| 
| DeAndre' Bembry (20)
| Alex Len (8)
| Trae Young (8)
| McCamish Pavilion6,619
| 1–0
|- style="background:#fcc;"
| 2
| October 5
| @ Memphis
| 
| Tyler Dorsey (18)
| Omari Spellman (9)
| Trae Young (5)
| FedEx Forum10,492
| 1–1
|- style="background:#fcc;"
| 3
| October 7
| @ Oklahoma City
| 
| Alex Len (18)
| Omari Spellman (7)
| Taurean Prince (4)
| Chesapeake Energy Arena14,470
| 1–2
|- style="background:#bfb;"
| 4
| October 10
| San Antonio
| 
| Taurean Prince (25)
| Alex Len (10)
| Trae Young (7)
| McCamish Pavilion7,433
| 2–2
|- style="background:#fcc;"
| 5
| October 12
| @ Miami
| 
| Jeremy Lin (20)
| Alex Poythress (8)
| Trae Young (5)
| American Airlines Arena19,600
| 2–3

Regular season 

|- style="background:#fcc
| 1
| October 17
| @ New York
| 
| Taurean Prince (21)
| Bazemore, Prince, Young (6)
| Taurean Prince (6)
| Madison Square Garden18,249
| 0–1
|- style="background:#fcc
| 2
| October 19
| @ Memphis
| 
| Taurean Prince (28)
| Kent Bazemore (8)
| Trae Young (9)
| FedExForum17,019
| 0–2
|- style="background:#cfc
| 3
| October 21
| @ Cleveland
| 
| Trae Young (35)
| Alex Len (11)
| Trae Young (11)
| Quicken Loans Arena19,432
| 1–2
|- style="background:#cfc
| 4
| October 24
| Dallas
| 
| Kent Bazemore (32)
| DeAndre' Bembry (16)
| Kent Bazemore (7)
| State Farm Arena16,705
| 2–2
|- style="background:#fcc
| 5
| October 27
| Chicago
| 
| Taurean Prince (16)
| Dewayne Dedmon (13)
| Young, Spellman (4)
| State Farm Arena15,549
| 2–3
|- style="background:#fcc
| 6
| October 29
| @ Philadelphia
| 
| Kent Bazemore (18)
| DeAndre' Bembry (7)
| Trae Young (8)
| Wells Fargo Center20,269
| 2–4
|- style="background:#fcc
| 7
| October 30
| @ Cleveland
| 
| Trae Young (24)
| Alex Len (9)
| Jeremy Lin (8)
| Quicken Loans Arena19,432
| 2–5

|- style="background:#fcc;"
| 8
| November 1
| Sacramento
| 
| Jeremy Lin (23)
| Taurean Prince (7)
| Trae Young (10)
| State Farm Arena12,095
| 2–6
|- style="background:#cfc
| 9
| November 3
| Miami
| 
| Trae Young (24)
| Dewayne Dedmon (13)
| Trae Young (15)
| State Farm Arena16,303
| 3–6
|- style="background:#fcc
| 10
| November 6
| @ Charlotte
| 
| Jeremy Lin (19)
| Bembry, Dedmon (6)
| Trae Young (10)
| Spectrum Center13,955
| 3-7
|- style="background:#fcc
| 11
| November 7
| New York
| 
| Omari Spellman (18)
| Omari Spellman (10)
| Trae Young (8)
| State Farm Arena12,412
| 3–8
|- style="background:#fcc
| 12
| November 9
| Detroit
| 
| Jeremy Lin (19)
| Omari Spellman (10)
| Trae Young (8)
| State Farm Arena14,759
| 3–9
|-style="background:#fcc
| 13
| November 11
| @ LA Lakers
| 
| Taurean Prince (23)
| Alex Len (11)
| Trae Young (12)
| Staples Center18,997
| 3–10
|- style="background:#fcc;"
| 14
| November 13
| @ Golden State
| 
| Taurean Prince (22)
| Alex Poythress (8)
| Trae Young (5)
| Oracle Arena 19,596
| 3–11
|- style="background:#fcc;"
| 15
| November 15
| @ Denver
| 
| Jeremy Lin (16)
| Omari Spellman (10)
| Lin, Young (5)
| Pepsi Center 15,103
| 3–12
|- style="background:#fcc;"
| 16
| November 17
| @ Indiana
| 
| Jeremy Lin (16)
| Dewayne Dedmon (7)
| Lin, Young, Len, Bazemore (4)
| Bankers Life Fieldhouse17,491
| 3–13
|- style="background:#fcc;"
| 17
| November 19
| LA Clippers
| 
| Trae Young (25)
| Alex Len (12)
| Trae Young (17)
| State Farm Arena14,323
| 3–14
|- style="background:#fcc
| 18
| November 21
| Toronto
| 
| Jeremy Lin (26)
| Dewayne Dedmon (7)
| Trae Young (5)
| State Farm Arena15,058
| 3–15
|-style="background:#fcc
| 19
| November 23
| Boston
|
|Jeremy Lin (19)
|Bembry, Dedmon, Collins (7)
|Jeremy Lin (10)
| State Farm Arena15,017
| 3–16
|-style="background:#cfc
| 20
| November 25
| Charlotte
| 
| John Collins (23)
| John Collins (11)
| DeAndre' Bembry (6)
| State Farm Arena12,977
| 4–16
|- style="background:#cfc
| 21
| November 27
| @ Miami
| 
| Taurean Prince (18)
| Alex Len (7)
| Trae Young (10)
| American Airlines Arena19,600
| 5–16
|-style="background:#fcc
| 22
| November 28
| @ Charlotte
| 
| Trae Young (18)
| John Collins (10)
| Young, Huerter, Collins (4)
| Spectrum Center12,971
| 5–17
|-style="background:#fcc
| 23
| November 30
| @ Oklahoma City
| 
| Len, Collins (19)
| John Collins (11)
| Trae Young (8)
| Chesapeake Energy Arena18,203
| 5–18

|- style="background:#fcc
| 24
| December 3
| Golden State
| 
| John Collins (24)
| John Collins (11)
| Jeremy Lin (5)
| State Farm Arena16,631
| 5–19
|- style="background:#fcc
| 25
| December 5
| Washington
| 
| John Collins (26)
| John Collins (14)
| Young, Bembry, Bazemore (6)
| State Farm Arena12,551
| 5–20
|- style="background:#cfc
| 26
| December 8
| Denver
| 
| John Collins (30)
| John Collins (12)
| Kent Bazemore (8)
| State Farm Arena14,409
| 6–20
|- style="background:#fcc
| 27
| December 12
| @ Dallas
| 
| Trae Young (24)
| John Collins (17)
| Trae Young (10)
| American Airlines Center19,643
| 6–21
|- style="background:#fcc
| 28
| December 14
| @ Boston
| 
| Kevin Huerter (19)
| John Collins (14)
| Kent Bazemore (7)
| TD Garden18,624
| 6–22
|- style="background:#fcc
| 29
| December 16
| @ Brooklyn
| 
| John Collins (29)
| Dewayne Dedmon (12)
| Trae Young (10)
| Barclays Center13,955
| 6–23
|- style="background:#cfc
| 30
| December 18
| Washington
| 
| John Collins (26)
| John Collins (14)
| Young, Lin (4)
| State Farm Arena16,489
| 7–23
|- style="background:#cfc
| 31
| December 21
| @ New York
| 
| Kent Bazemore (22)
| John Collins (16)
| Trae Young (10)
| Madison Square Garden19,080
| 8–23
|- style="background:#cfc
| 32
| December 23
| @ Detroit
| 
| Vince Carter (18)
| Alex Len (17)
| Trae Young (6)
| Little Caesars Arena16,532
| 9–23
|- style="background:#fcc
| 33
| December 26
| Indiana
| 
| Kent Bazemore (32)
| Dewayne Dedmon (15)
| Trae Young (9)
| State Farm Arena15,026
| 9–24
|- style="background:#cfc
| 34
| December 28
| @ Minnesota
| 
| Kent Bazemore (23)
| Dewayne Dedmon (13)
| Trae Young (11)
| Target Center18,978
| 10–24
|- style="background:#cfc
| 35
| December 29
| Cleveland
| 
| Carter, Young (21)
| John Collins (12)
| Trae Young (9)
| State Farm Arena16,460
| 11–24
|- style="background:#fcc
| 36
| December 31
| @ Indiana
| 
| Huerter, Collins  (22)
| John Collins (16)
| Trae Young (7)
| Bankers Life Fieldhouse17,923
| 11–25

|- style="background:#fcc
| 37
| January 2
| @ Washington
| 
| John Collins (21)
| Alex Len (11)
| Trae Young (7)
| Capital One Arena15,324
| 11–26
|- style="background:#fcc
| 38
| January 4
| @ Milwaukee
| 
| DeAndre' Bembry (19)
| Alex Len (8)
| Trae Young (10)
| Fiserv Forum17,632
| 11–27
|- style="background:#cfc
| 39
| January 6
| Miami
| 
| Trae Young (19)
| John Collins (13)
| Kevin Huerter (7)
| State Farm Arena16,630
| 12–27
|- style="background:#fcc
| 40
| January 8
| @ Toronto
| 
| John Collins (21)
| John Collins (14)
| Trae Young (9)
| Scotiabank Arena19,800
| 12–28
|- style="background:#fcc
| 41
| January 9
| @ Brooklyn
| 
| John Collins (30)
| John Collins (14)
| Trae Young (7)
| Barclays Center14,531
| 12–29
|- style="background:#cfc
| 42
| January 11
| @ Philadelphia
| 
| Kevin Huerter (29)
| John Collins (9)
| Dewayne Dedmon (7)
| Wells Fargo Center20,487
| 13–29
|- style="background:#fcc
| 43
| January 13
| Milwaukee
| 
| Trae Young (26)
| John Collins (11)
| Jeremy Lin (5)
| State Farm Arena16,292
| 13–30
|- style="background:#cfc
| 44
| January 15
| Oklahoma City
| 
| John Collins (26)
| Alex Len (11)
| Trae Young (11)
| State Farm Arena15,045
| 14–30
|- style="background:#fcc
| 45
| January 19
| Boston
| 
| Kevin Huerter (18)
| John Collins (11)
| Huerter, Young (7)
| State Farm Arena16,626
| 14–31
|- style="background:#fcc
| 46
| January 21
| Orlando
| 
| Dewayne Dedmon (24)
| John Collins (10)
| DeAndre' Bembry (7)
| State Farm Arena16,611
| 14–32
|- style="background:#cfc
| 47
| January 23
| @ Chicago
| 
| John Collins (35)
| Alex Len (10)
| Trae Young (12)
| United Center18,223
| 15–32
|- style="background:#fcc
| 48
| January 26
| @ Portland
| 
| Trae Young (30)
| Collins, Prince (6)
| Trae Young (8)
| Moda Center19,629
| 15–33
|- style="background:#cfc
| 49
| January 28
| @ LA Clippers
| 
| Trae Young (26)
| Dewayne Dedmon (10)
| Trae Young (8)
| Staples Center17,382
| 16–33
|- style="background:#fcc
| 50
| January 30
| @ Sacramento
| 
| Trae Young (23)
| Dewayne Dedmon (9)
| Trae Young (8)
| Golden 1 Center17,583
| 16–34

|- style="background:#fcc
| 51
| February 1
| @ Utah
| 
| Trae Young (28)
| DeAndre' Bembry (8)
| Trae Young (9)
| Vivint Smart Home Arena18,306
| 16–35
|- style="background:#cfc
| 52
| February 2
| @ Phoenix
| 
| John Collins (35)
| John Collins (16)
| Trae Young (8)
| Talking Stick Resort Arena15,534
| 17–35
|- style="background:#cfc
| 53
| February 4
| @ Washington
| 
| Taurean Prince (21)
| John Collins (11)
| Trae Young (10)
| Capital One Arena15,025
| 18–35
|- style="background:#fcc
| 54
| February 7
| Toronto
| 
| Prince, Young (19)
| John Collins (12)
| Huerter, Young (5)
| State Farm Arena16,038
| 18–36
|- style="background:#fcc
| 55
| February 9
| Charlotte
| 
| Trae Young (20)
| Len, Dedmon (7)
| Trae Young (11)
| State Farm Arena15,048
| 18–37
|- style="background:#fcc
| 56
| February 10
| Orlando
| 
| Alex Len (16)
| Dewayne Dedmon (6)
| Trae Young (7)
| State Farm Arena13,370
| 18–38
|- style="background:#cfc
| 57
| February 12
| LA Lakers
| 
| Young, Collins (22)
| John Collins (8)
| Trae Young (14)
| State Farm Arena16,824
| 19–38
|- style="background:#fcc
| 58
| February 14
| New York
| 
| Dewayne Dedmon (21)
| Omari Spellman (9)
| Trae Young (11)
| State Farm Arena14,179
| 19–39
|- style="background:#fcc
| 59
| February 22
| Detroit
| 
| Trae Young (30)
| Dewayne Dedmon (10)
| Trae Young (10)
| State Farm Arena14,067
| 19–40
|- style="background:#cfc
| 60
| February 23
| Phoenix
| 
| Young, Bazemore (23)
| John Collins (14)
| Trae Young (8)
| State Farm Arena15,214
| 20–40
|- style="background:#fcc
| 61
| February 25
| @ Houston
| 
| Trae Young (36)
| John Collins (12)
| Trae Young (8)
| Toyota Center18,055
| 20–41
|- style="background:#cfc
| 62
| February 27
| Minnesota
| 
| Trae Young (36)
| Dewayne Dedmon (10)
| Trae Young (10)
| State Farm Arena14,101
| 21–41

|- style="background:#fcc
| 63
| March 1
| Chicago
| 
| Trae Young (49)
| Dewayne Dedmon (12)
| Trae Young (16)
| State Farm Arena15,267
| 21–42
|- style="background:#cfc
| 64
| March 3
| @ Chicago
| 
| Alex Len (28)
| Dewayne Dedmon (12)
| DeAndre' Bembry (7)
| United Center20,526
| 22–42
|- style="background:#fcc
| 65
| March 4
| @ Miami
| 
| Vince Carter (21)
| Dedmon, Poythress (6)
| Trae Young (8)
| American Airlines Arena19,600
| 22–43
|- style="background:#fcc
| 66
| March 6
| San Antonio
| 
| Trae Young (22)
| John Collins (10)
| Kevin Huerter (5)
| State Farm Arena15,208
| 22–44
|- style="background:#fcc
| 67
| March 9
| Brooklyn
| 
| John Collins (33)
| John Collins (20)
| Trae Young (11)
| State Farm Arena16,527
| 22–45
|- style="background:#cfc
| 68
| March 10
| New Orleans
| 
| Kevin Huerter (27)
| John Collins (10)
| Trae Young (10)
| State Farm Arena14,337
| 23–45
|- style="background:#cfc
| 69
| March 13
| Memphis
| 
| John Collins (27)
| John Collins (12)
| Trae Young (8)
| State Farm Arena15,169
| 24–45
|- style="background:#fcc
| 70
| March 16
| @ Boston
| 
| Trae Young (26)
| Dewayne Dedmon (13)
| John Collins (6)
| TD Garden18,624
| 24–46
|- style="background:#fcc
| 71
| March 17
| @ Orlando
| 
| Trae Young (20)
| Dewayne Dedmon (14)
| Trae Young (5)
| Amway Center18,045
| 24–47
|- style="background:#fcc
| 72
| March 19
| Houston
| 
| Trae Young (21)
| John Collins (10)
| Trae Young (12)
| State Farm Arena16,293
| 24–48
|- style="background:#cfc
| 73
| March 21
| Utah
| 
| Trae Young (23)
| Dewayne Dedmon (9)
| Trae Young (11)
| State Farm Arena15,569
| 25–48
|- style="background:#cfc
| 74
| March 23
| Philadelphia
| 
| Trae Young (32)
| John Collins (9)
| Trae Young (11)
| State Farm Arena16,640
| 26–48
|- style="background:#cfc
| 75
| March 26
| @ New Orleans
| 
| Trae Young (33)
| Dewayne Dedmon (9)
| Trae Young (12)
| Smoothie King Center14,751
| 27–48
|- style="background:#fcc
| 76
| March 29
| Portland
| 
| Trae Young (26)
| Trae Young (9)
| Trae Young (7)
| State Farm Arena16,182
| 27–49
|- style="background:#cfc
| 77
| March 31
| Milwaukee
| 
| Justin Anderson (24)
| Justin Anderson (12)
| Trae Young (16)
| State Farm Arena16,660
| 28–49

|- style="background:#fcc
| 78
| April 2
| @ San Antonio
| 
| Kent Bazemore (26)
| Dewayne Dedmon (10)
| Trae Young (6)
| AT&T Center18,354
| 28–50
|- style="background:#cfc
| 79
| April 3
| Philadelphia
| 
| Trae Young (33)
| John Collins (8)
| Trae Young (12)
| State Farm Arena16,638
| 29–50
|- style="background:#fcc
| 80
| April 5
| @ Orlando
| 
| Trae Young (22)
| DeAndre' Bembry (10)
| Trae Young (6)
| Amway Center18,999
| 29–51
|- style="background:#fcc
| 81
| April 7
| @ Milwaukee
| 
| Alex Len (33)
| Vince Carter (9)
| Kevin Huerter (6)
| Fiserv Forum17,775
| 29–52
|- style="background:#fcc
| 82
| April 10
| Indiana
| 
| Trae Young (23)
| John Collins (25)
| Trae Young (11)
| State Farm Arena17,143
| 29–53

Player statistics

|-
| align="left"| || align="center"| PG
| 34 || 1 || 428 || 60 || 65 || 14 || 5 || 108
|-
| align="left"| || align="center"| SF
| 48 || 4 || 463 || 84 || 23 || 22 || 13 || 178
|-
| align="left"| || align="center"| SG
| 67 || 35 || 1,643 || 261 || 152 || 89 || 42 || 779
|-
| align="left"| || align="center"| SG
| style=";"|82 || 15 || 1,931 || 358 || 202 || style=";"|105 || 41 || 687
|-
| align="left"| || align="center"| SF
| 76 || 9 || 1,330 || 194 || 87 || 44 || 27 || 562
|-
| align="left"| || align="center"| PF
| 61 || 59 || 1,829 || style=";"|595 || 121 || 22 || 39 || 1,188
|-
| align="left"|‡ || align="center"| C
| 9 || 0 || 118 || 36 || 5 || 3 || 5 || 36
|-
| align="left"| || align="center"| C
| 64 || 52 || 1,609 || 480 || 90 || 69 || style=";"|71 || 693
|-
| align="left"|† || align="center"| SG
| 27 || 0 || 251 || 43 || 17 || 7 || 1 || 90
|-
| align="left"|‡ || align="center"| SG
| 19 || 3 || 204 || 47 || 22 || 6 || 1 || 57
|-
| align="left"| || align="center"| SG
| 75 || 59 || 2,048 || 245 || 214 || 65 || 25 || 727
|-
| align="left"|† || align="center"| C
| 5 || 1 || 56 || 11 || 0 || 1 || 0 || 15
|-
| align="left"|† || align="center"| SF
| 6 || 0 || 43 || 8 || 0 || 2 || 0 || 21
|-
| align="left"| || align="center"| C
| 77 || 31 || 1,544 || 424 || 86 || 27 || 69 || 854
|-
| align="left"|‡ || align="center"| PG
| 51 || 1 || 1,003 || 119 || 181 || 38 || 7 || 546
|-
| align="left"| || align="center"| C
| 18 || 0 || 173 || 39 || 17 || 6 || 4 || 80
|-
| align="left"| || align="center"| PF
| 21 || 1 || 305 || 76 || 17 || 4 || 10 || 107
|-
| align="left"| || align="center"| SG
| 1 || 0 || 4 || 0 || 0 || 0 || 0 || 3
|-
| align="left"| || align="center"| PF
| 46 || 11 || 805 || 194 || 47 || 26 || 25 || 272
|-
| align="left"| || align="center"| SF
| 55 || 47 || 1,552 || 199 || 118 || 53 || 19 || 742
|-
| align="left"| || align="center"| PG
| 81 || style=";"|81 || style=";"|2,503 || 301 || style=";"|653 || 72 || 15 || style=";"|1,549
|-
| align="left"|† || align="center"| C
| 2 || 0 || 11 || 6 || 1 || 0 || 0 || 0
|}
After all games.
‡Waived during the season
†Traded during the season
≠Acquired during the season

Transactions

Trades

Free agents

Additions

Subtractions

References

Atlanta Hawks seasons
Atlanta Hawks
Atlanta Hawks
Atlanta Hawks